Marienfeld Abbey is a former Cistercian abbey in the Marienfeld district of Harsewinkel, in the district of Gütersloh, Germany. It was founded in 1185 by monks from Hardehausen Abbey and dissolved in 1803 after German Mediatisation, becoming state property and then in 1804 a parish church. The monastic buildings were demolished, but since Pentecost 2004 two Benedictine monks have lived at the church, restoring its monastic status.

Cistercian monasteries in Germany
Benedictine monasteries in Germany
Roman Catholic churches in North Rhine-Westphalia
Buildings and structures in Gütersloh (district)